"Big, Big Plans" is a song recorded by American country music singer Chris Lane. It was released in June 2019 as the lead single from his upcoming third studio album. Lane co-wrote the song with Ernest K. Smith and Jacob Durrett.

Background
Lane shared about the song’s creation, and inspired by his wife Lauren Bushnell's relationship and proposal, He said: “You never know if a song personal to your life is going to react in that way, but I’m thankful it did,” “Now I see people making it their own story, using the song for their big moment as well. That’s really special.”

Music video
There's two videos for the song. "Video for Lauren" was uploaded on June 19, 2019, including home video of the couple, and the proposal which took place in the backyard of Bushnell's family's Oregon home.

"Wedding Video" was uploaded on November 13, 2019, directed by Justin Clough and filmed on-site Nashville’s 14TENN, which Lane and Lauren became husband and wife. The video was filmed on October 25, 2019, and showed clips from their wedding ceremony.

Charts

Weekly charts

Year-end charts

Certifications

References

2019 singles
2019 songs
Chris Lane songs
Big Loud singles
Song recordings produced by Joey Moi
Songs about marriage
Songs written by Ernest (musician)